Muilheh-ye Olya (also Romanized as Mūīlḥeh-ye ‘Olyā; also known as Molḩeh-ye Bālā and Molḩeh-ye ‘Olyā) is a village in Azadeh Rural District, Moshrageh District, Ramshir County, Khuzestan Province, Iran. At the 2006 census, its population was 252, in 39 families.

References 

Populated places in Ramshir County